List of Italian rolling stock.  The following list includes rolling stock that works, or has worked, on the Italian national railway network Ferrovie dello Stato Italiane and on private lines and lines in concession. The list is not exhaustive and additions are welcome.

Railways
The history of Italian railways may be divided into three periods:
 Pre-1885, small railways were built, some privately owned and some state owned
 1885–1905, the creation of the "great networks"
 1905, nationalization

Abbreviations
 FAS = Ferrovia Alessandria–Stradella
 FS = Ferrovie dello Stato, Italian State Railways, established 1905
 LVCI = Imperial-regia società privilegiata delle strade ferrate lombardo-venete e dell'Italia Centrale
 RA = Rete Adriatica, Adriatic Network, 1885-1905
 RM = Rete Mediterranea, Mediterranean Network, 1885-1905
 SB = Südbahn, Southern Railway (Austria)
 SFAI = Società per le strade ferrate dell'Alta Italia, Upper Italian Railways, 1865 to 1885
 SFCS = Società per le Strade Ferrate Calabro-Sicule
 SFM = Società per le Strade Ferrate Meridionali, 1862-1885
 SFR = Società per le Strade Ferrate Romane, 1865-1885
 SFSP = Strade Ferrate dello Stato Piemontese 
 SV = Società Veneta
 VER = Victor Emmanuel Railway, 1853–1867, later SFCS

Locomotives

Rete Adriatica
Listed in order of Rete Adriatica (RA) number

Rete Mediterranea
Listed in order of Rete Mediterranea (RM) number

Società Veneta

Südbahn

References

Further reading
 P.M. Kalla-Bishop: Italian State Railways Steam Locomotives. Tourret Publishing, Abingdon, 1986, 

Locomotives of Italy
Rolling stock
Rete Adriatica steam locomotives
Rete Mediterranea steam locomotives
Ferrovie dello Stato Italiane
 
Italian